Manu Bazar railway station  is a railway station in Manu Bazar,  South Tripura district, Tripura, India. Its code is MUBR. It serves Manu Bazar village. The station lies on the Agartala – Sabroom rail section, which comes under the Lumding railway division of the Northeast Frontier Railway. The segment from Agartala to Sabroom via Udaipur became operational on 3 October 2019.

Station layout

See also

References

External links

 Indian Railways site
 Indian railway fan club

Railway stations in South Tripura district
Lumding railway division
Proposed railway stations in India